Jesús Santiago Pérez (born 25 May 2004), sometimes known as Yellu, is a Spanish professional footballer who plays as a midfielder for Valencia CF Mestalla.

Club career
Born in Estrecho de San Ginés, Cartagena, Region of Murcia, Santiago joined Valencia CF's at the age of 14, after representing EF Torre Pacheco, FC Cartagena and CD Minera. On 5 February 2022, he first appeared with the reserves in a 2–2 Tercera División RFEF away draw against UD Benigànim, but was only an unused substitute.

On 1 April 2022, Santiago renewed his contract with the Che until 2026. Eighteen days later, he made his first team – and La Liga – debut, replacing Yunus Musah in a 0–2 away loss against Villarreal CF.

References

External links
 
 
 

2004 births
Living people
Sportspeople from Cartagena, Spain
Spanish footballers
Footballers from the Region of Murcia
Association football midfielders
La Liga players
Segunda Federación players
Valencia CF Mestalla footballers
Valencia CF players
Spain youth international footballers